The Hamilton by-election in Hamilton, Lanarkshire, Scotland, was held on 2 November 1967. It was called after the former Labour MP, Tom Fraser, resigned in order to take up the position as head of the North of Scotland Hydro-Electric Board. The constituency had been a safe seat for Labour, who had taken over two-thirds of the vote there in every general election from 1945 to 1966, when only the Conservatives had stood against them.

The election saw a surprise victory for the Scottish National Party candidate Winnie Ewing. The SNP took 46% of the vote in a constituency which they had not even contested at the 1966 general election held the previous year, and gained the seat from the Labour Party with a swing of nearly 38%. Ewing did not retain the seat at the following general election, but the SNP have been continuously represented in the House of Commons ever since.

Background
Prior to this by-election, the SNP had been a peripheral movement in Scottish politics. They had taken only 5% of the vote across Scotland in 1966, having stood candidates in 23 out of 71 seats. In the 1950s, they had never stood more than five candidates or taken more than 1% of the Scottish vote in general elections. However, Hamilton was not the first Westminster seat to be won by the SNP; the party had won a short-lived victory at the 1945 Motherwell by-election. In the years before Ewing's victory, there had been other breakthroughs by nationalist parties in Britain – including Gwynfor Evans' similarly groundbreaking victory for Plaid Cymru at the 1966 Carmarthen by-election, a big advance for the SNP at the 1967 Glasgow Pollok by-election, and SNP gains in local elections, including becoming the largest party in local government in Stirling.

On the day of the election it was reported that Labour were strong favourites to win the seat with bookmakers, who made them 10 to 1 on to win the seat, and that Labour candidate Alex Wilson had indicated the previous day that he was more confident than ever of victory.

Result

Aftermath and legacy
The SNP's leadership merely told Ewing to: "try to come a good second in order to encourage the members". "As ever," Ewing later wrote, "I overdid it, and as a result my life changed for ever." After her victory was declared, Ewing famously said to the crowd outside "Stop the World, Scotland wants to get on." 

Historian Tom Devine describes the 1967 Hamilton by-election as "the most sensational by-election result in Scotland since 1945" and Isobel Lindsay called it a "watershed" moment in Scottish political history. Gerry Hassan similarly describes it as being a pivotal moment in Scottish politics.

In 2007, on the 40th anniversary of Ewing's victory, the then SNP leader Alex Salmond said: "That by-election was undoubtedly a catalyst for reform, without which the movement for a Scottish Parliament would have been delayed still further. It forced the pace of change and demanded attention for the cause of Scottish independence from Westminster."

References

See also
 Royal Commission on the Constitution (United Kingdom)
 Elections in Scotland
 List of United Kingdom by-elections

1967 in Scotland
1960s elections in Scotland
Politics of South Lanarkshire
1967 elections in the United Kingdom
By-elections to the Parliament of the United Kingdom in Scottish constituencies
History of South Lanarkshire
20th century in South Lanarkshire